Anssumane "Ansu" Fati Vieira (born 31 October 2002) is a Spanish professional footballer who plays as a forward for La Liga club Barcelona and the Spain national team.

Fati was born in Guinea-Bissau but chose to represent the Spain national team after gaining citizenship. He was one of Spain's most exciting football talents, and one of the best young players in the world.

Early and personal life
He moved to Sevilla with his family at the age of six, when his older brother Braima signed for Sevilla. His other brother, Miguel Fati, is also a footballer. His older cousin, Ença Fati is a footballer in Portugal.

His father, Bori Fati, is an ex-footballer, who was born in Guinea-Bissau. After emigrating to Portugal, Bori played for some teams in the lower leagues. Then he moved to Marinaleda, a small town located near Seville that was offering work to immigrants. After struggling in Marinaleda, he met the mayor, Juan Manuel Sánchez Gordillo, and found a job as a driver. He then settled in the nearby town of Herrera, where Ansu spent most of his childhood, and started his football training. Though born in Guinea-Bissau, Bori has said he is "a Sevillian".

Club career

Barcelona

Early career
After representing local side Herrera and the youth teams of Sevilla, he joined Barcelona's La Masia in 2012, aged ten, a year after his brother had made the same move.

2019–20 season
On 24 July 2019, Fati signed his first professional contract with Barcelona, agreeing to a deal until 2022. On 25 August, before even appearing with the reserves, Fati made his first team and La Liga debut. He came on as a late-game substitute for goalscorer Carles Pérez in a 5–2 home win over Real Betis. Aged 16 years and 298 days, he became the second-youngest player to debut for the club, only 18 days older than Vicenç Martínez in 1941.

On 31 August 2019, he scored his first professional goal in a 2–2 away draw between Barcelona and Osasuna at the age of 16 years and 304 days, becoming the Barcelona senior team's youngest goalscorer ever and the third-youngest scorer in the history of La Liga.

On 14 September 2019, in his first career start, Fati became the youngest player in the history of La Liga to score and assist in the same match, at the age of 16 years and 318 days. Fati scored a goal in the 2nd minute which was assisted by Frenkie de Jong and later assisted Frenkie de Jong's goal in the 7th minute of an eventual 5–2 home win against Valencia.

On 17 September, Fati made his Champions League debut in a 0–0 away draw against Borussia Dortmund, becoming the youngest player to feature for Barcelona in the competition at the age of 16 years and 321 days, breaking the previous record held by Bojan Krkić (17 years and 22 days); he also became the third-youngest player ever to appear in the competition. On 10 December, Fati became the youngest goalscorer in UEFA Champions League history at the age of 17 years and 40 days when he scored the game winner in Barcelona's 2–1 victory over Inter Milan at the San Siro.

On 2 February 2020, Fati became the youngest player to score a brace in La Liga, scoring both goals in Barcelona's 2–1 win over Levante. On 5 July, Barcelona defeated Villarreal away from home and he scored the fourth goal in the 4–1 win. His goal was the 9,000th in Barça's history. On 9 July 2020, Fati was sent off after fouling Fernando Calero in the derby match against Espanyol. Fati had only entered the match five minutes earlier as a second-half substitute for Nélson Semedo.

2020–21 season
On 23 September 2020, Fati was officially promoted to the first team. Four days later, in Barcelona's first match of the 2020–21 La Liga season and the first under new head coach, Ronald Koeman, Fati scored a brace and forced a penalty in a 4–0 win over Villarreal. He scored again in the following match, a 3–0 away win over Celta Vigo on 1 October. His performances led to him being named as the La Liga Player of the Month for September 2020. On 20 October, he scored a goal in a 5–1 win over Ferencváros in the Champions League, to become the first player to score more than one goal in the competition before turning 18. On 24 October, he scored a goal in a 1–3 defeat against Real Madrid, to become the second youngest scorer in El Clásico, at 17 years and 359 days, behind Alfonso Navarro who scored at 17 years and 356 days on 30 March 1947. On 7 November, Fati suffered a knee injury against Real Betis and was subbed off at half-time; tests later confirmed that he tore the meniscus in his left knee. Two days later he underwent surgery and the club announced that he would be out for approximately four months. Unfortunately, he was out for 9 months — he started training after 9 months — ahead of the 2021–22 La Liga season.

2021–22 season
Ahead of the 2021-22 season, Barcelona announced Fati would inherit the number 10 shirt from Lionel Messi. On 5 August 2021, Ansu Fati returned to training on the pitch at the Ciutat Esportiva after nine months out of action. On 26 September, Fati made his first appearance after 323 days of absence in a 3–0 home victory against Levante. He came on as a substitute, playing for 10 minutes and scoring within minutes after coming on. On 20 January 2022, he suffered a hamstring injury in a 3–2 defeat to Athletic Bilbao in the Copa del Rey. On 1 May, he returned after a three-month injury absence to play in a 2–1 win against Mallorca.

International career
Fati was originally eligible to represent Guinea-Bissau at international level, but did not represent the nation of his birth at any level. After his debut in La Liga, the Royal Spanish Football Federation (RFEF) showed interest in him, with Diario AS reporting that the Spanish government had set its sights on granting Fati citizenship with a view to including him in the squad for the 2019 FIFA U-17 World Cup. He was also reportedly eligible for a Portuguese passport through his grandparents' birth in colonial Portuguese Guinea.

Fati was granted Spanish citizenship on 20 September 2019, renouncing his Bissau-Guinean citizenship. He was called up to the Spain under-21 team on 11 October 2019, following an injury to Carles Pérez. Fati made his debut for the Spain under-21 team on 15 October 2019 against Montenegro.

Fati received his first call up to the full Spain squad on 20 August 2020, for the initial two matches of the 2020–21 UEFA Nations League. He made his full international debut on 3 September 2020, coming off the bench for the second 45 minutes in a 1–1 draw to Germany. He scored his first goal in his first international start on 6 September 2020, scoring Spain's third goal against Ukraine to be the national team's youngest ever goalscorer at the age of 17 years and 311 days; hence, breaking the 95-year record of Juan Errazquin, aged 18 years and 344 days. He also became the youngest player to start a match in the UEFA Nations League, breaking the previous record of Welsh player Ethan Ampadu in 2018, aged 17 years and 357 days. Both these records were beaten by his teammate at Barcelona, Gavi, on 5 June 2022.

On 11 November 2022, it was announced that Fati would be part of Spain's 2022 FIFA World Cup squad. He played two games – both as a substitute – as Spain were knocked out by Morocco in the round of 16.

Style of play
Widely considered by several pundits to be one of the most talented and promising young players in the world, Fati's playing style has been compared with that of former Barcelona player Lionel Messi. A versatile forward, Fati is capable of playing in any attacking position; he started his career as a striker, although he was later moved to the position of left winger. Being adept with either foot, despite being naturally right-footed, he is also capable of playing on the right flank, in the centre as a false 9, as a second striker or number 11, or in a free role as an attacking midfielder or number 10. A 2019 profile by FourFourTwo magazine described him with the following words: "Standing at 5ft 10in, Fati boasts a powerful frame and brings a physical approach to the game which is often lacking among a technically gifted Barcelona side. Nevertheless, despite his robust physique, the La Masia graduate possesses outstanding dribbling skills which, when combined with his speed, makes him incredibly difficult to stop in one-on-one situations." It also highlighted his eye for goal and ability in the air, as well as his vision and ability to control play from midfield. His perceived selfishness and decision-making were instead highlighted as weaknesses in his game. Tor-Kristian Karlsen of ESPN described Fati as a "generational talent" in 2021, praising him for his speed, acceleration, ambidexterity, low centre of gravity, and technical skills, which make him difficult to dispossess, also noting his intelligence, movement, defensive work-rate, and link-up play as some of his main strengths.

Career statistics

Club

International

Scores and results list Spain's goal tally first.

Honours
Barcelona
 Copa del Rey: 2020–21
 Supercopa de España: 2022–23

Individual
 UEFA La Liga Revelation Team of the Year: 2019–20
 La Liga Player of the Month: September 2020
 IFFHS Men's World Youth (U20) Team: 2020, 2022
 IFFHS Men's Youth (U20) UEFA Team: 2020, 2022
 Goal.com NxGn: 2021

See also
 List of Spain international footballers born outside Spain

References

External links
 Profile at the FC Barcelona website
 
 

2002 births
Living people
Bissau-Guinean emigrants to Spain
Naturalised citizens of Spain
People from Sierra Sur (Seville)
Sportspeople from the Province of Seville
Spanish people of Bissau-Guinean descent
Spanish sportspeople of African descent
Footballers from Andalusia
Sportspeople from Bissau
Spanish footballers
Bissau-Guinean footballers
Association football forwards
La Liga players
FC Barcelona players
Spain under-21 international footballers
Spain international footballers
2022 FIFA World Cup players